Egypt competed at the 2016 Summer Olympics in Rio de Janeiro, Brazil, from 5 to 21 August 2016. Since the nation's debut in 1912, Egyptian athletes had appeared in every edition of the Summer Olympic Games except 1932 and 1980, joining the United States-led boycott in the latter.

The Egyptian Olympic Committee sent its largest ever delegation to the Games, with a total of 120 athletes, 83 men and 37 women, competing across 22 sports. The Egyptian roster also witnessed more women participating at the Games than those who attended in London four years earlier, breaking its previous record by just a small fraction.

Egypt returned home from Rio de Janeiro with three bronze medals, which matched its overall tally from the 2004 Summer Olympics in Athens. Moreover, these Games marked the first time Egyptian women ascended the Olympic podium in the nation's 104-year history. These medals were distributed to taekwondo fighter Hedaya Malak (women's 57 kg), as well as weightlifters Mohamed Ihab and former Youth Olympian Sara Samir, who accomplished a historic feat as the first Arab woman to accept an Olympic medal in her sport.

In addition to the success and historic firsts of the bronze medalists, several Egyptian athletes reached the finals of their respective events, but narrowly missed out on the podium. Among them were shooting team Afaf El-Hodhod (fifth, women's air pistol), freestyle wrestler Enas Mostafa (fifth, women's 69 kg), and three others in weightlifting, namely Shaimaa Khalaf (fourth, women's +75 kg), Ahmed Saad (fifth, men's 62 kg), and Ragab Abdelhay (fifth, men's 94 kg).

Medalists

The following Egyptian athletes won medals at the Games. In the by discipline sections below, medalists' names are bolded.

|  style="text-align:left; width:78%; vertical-align:top;"|

|  style="text-align:left; width:22%; vertical-align:top;"|

Competitors
The Egyptian Olympic Committee (EOC) confirmed a roster of 120 athletes, 83 men and 37 women, to compete across 22 sports at the Games. It was the nation's largest ever delegation sent to the Olympics, breaking its previous record of 110 athletes set in 2012. These Games also witnessed more Egyptian women participating than those who attended in London four years earlier, constituting about 30 percent of the overall squad.

Handball and volleyball (both played exclusively by men) were the only collective sports in which Egypt qualified for the Games, having both returned to the Olympic scene after their absence from London 2012. Egypt's women's synchronized swimming and women's table tennis teams, however, participated for their third-straight and second-straight Games, respectively. For individual-based sports, Egypt marked its Olympic debut in women's beach volleyball, as well as its return to cycling after 16 years and diving after 32 years. Shooting accounted for the largest number of athletes on the Egyptian team, with 12 entries. There was a single competitor each in track cycling, equestrian jumping, artistic gymnastics, and sailing.

Of the 120 participants, twenty-eight of them returned to compete again, with the rest of the field attending their maiden Games in Rio de Janeiro. Among the returnees were foil fencer Alaaeldin Abouelkassem, who became the first from an African nation to win an Olympic medal in his sport; and heavyweight judoka Islam El Shehaby, who headed the roster as the lone Egyptian competitor going to his fourth straight Games. Eight Egyptian athletes competed at the 2014 Summer Youth Olympics in Nanjing before their senior Olympic debut, including weightlifter Sara Samir, modern pentathlete Haydy Morsy, distance swimmer Ahmed Akram, and shooters Afaf El-Hodhod (pistol) and Hadir Mekhimar (rifle).

Other notable athletes on the Egyptian roster featured modern pentathlon veteran Amro El-Geziry and his younger brother Omar, world-ranked taekwondo fighter Hedaya Malak, American-born swimming sprinter Farida Osman, and 2014 world bronze medalist Azmy Mehelba in men's skeet shooting. 16-year-old Morsy was Egypt's youngest competitor, with volleyball team captain Ashraf Abouelhassan rounding out the field as the oldest member (aged 41). Handball star and three-time Olympian Ahmed El-Ahmar was selected by EOC to lead the Egyptian squad as the flag bearer in the opening ceremony.

| width=78% align=left valign=top |
The following is the list of number of competitors participating in the Games. Note that reserves in fencing, field hockey, football, and handball are not counted as athletes:

Archery

Two Egyptian archers qualified each for both the men's and women's individual recurve by obtaining one of the three Olympic places available from the 2016 African Archery Championships in Windhoek, Namibia.

Athletics (track and field)

Egyptian athletes have so far achieved qualifying standards in the following athletics events (up to a maximum of 3 athletes in each event):

Track & road events

Field events

Boxing

Egypt has entered four boxers to compete in the following weight classes into the Olympic boxing tournament. Hosam Abdin was the only Egyptian boxer qualifying through the 2015 World Championships, while three further boxers (Abdelaal, Mohamed, and Salah) had claimed their Olympic spots at the 2016 African Qualification Tournament in Yaoundé, Cameroon.

Canoeing

Sprint
Egypt has qualified two boats for the following distances into the Olympic canoeing regatta through the 2016 African Sprint Qualifying Tournament.

Qualification Legend: FA = Qualify to final (medal); FB = Qualify to final B (non-medal)

Cycling

Track
Following the completion of the 2016 UCI Track Cycling World Championships, Egypt has entered one rider to compete only in the women's sprint at the Olympics for the first time, by virtue of her final individual UCI Olympic ranking in that event. This signified the nation's Olympic comeback to the sport of cycling for the first time since 2000, and to track cycling since 1924.

Sprint

Diving

Egyptian divers qualified for the following individual spots at the 2016 Olympic Games by virtue of their top national finish from Africa at the 2015 FINA World Championships.

Equestrian

Egypt has entered one jumping rider into the Olympic equestrian competition by virtue of a top four finish outside the group selection in the individual FEI Olympic Rankings.

Jumping

Fencing

Egyptian fencers have qualified a full squad each in the men's team foil by virtue of being the highest ranking team from Africa outside the world's top four in the FIE Olympic Team Rankings. Meanwhile, Mohamed Amer (men's sabre) and Noura Mohamed (women's foil) had claimed their Olympic spots on the Egyptian team as one of the two highest-ranked fencers from Africa outside the world's top 14 in the FIE Adjusted Official Rankings. Nada Hafez (women's sabre) and London 2012 épée fencer Ayman Fayez rounded out the roster by virtue of their top finish respectively at the African Zonal Qualifier in Algiers, Algeria.

Men

Women

Gymnastics

Artistic
Egypt has entered one artistic gymnast into the Olympic competition. London 2012 Olympian Sherine El-Zeiny received a spare berth freed up by South Africa as one of the highest-ranked gymnasts from Africa in the women's apparatus and all-around events, respectively, at the Olympic Test Event in Rio de Janeiro.

Women

Handball

Summary

Men's tournament

Egypt men's handball team qualified for the Olympics by attaining a top finish and securing a lone outright berth at the 2016 African Championships in Cairo.

Team roster

Group play

Judo

Egypt has qualified a total of five judokas for each of the following weight classes at the Games. Mohamed Mohy Eldin, Mohamed Abdelaal, Ramadan Darwish, and three-time Olympian Islam El Shehaby were ranked among the top 22 eligible judokas for men in the IJF World Ranking List of 30 May 2016, while Ahmed Abdelrahman at men's extra-lightweight (60 kg) earned a continental quota spot from the African region, as the highest-ranked Egyptian judoka outside of direct qualifying position.

El Shehaby lost his first match to Israel's Or Sasson, but refused to bow or shake hands with him, resulting to a loud jeer from the crowd. When Sasson extended his hand to shake after the match, El Shehaby backed away, shaking his head. The referee called El Shehaby back to the mat and obliged him to bow, at which point El Shehaby gave a quick nod of his head. El Shehaby's conduct was widely condemned as unsportsmanlike. It is unclear what potential punishment El Shehaby or Egyptian judo as a whole could face, but his hopes of medaling were dashed regardless due to Sasson's decisive performance in the quarterfinals.

Before his match, El Shehaby was under pressure to forfeit, as Iranian Javad Mahjoub had done years earlier before his match with Or Sasson.

El Shehaby's refusal to shake hands had precedent, in actions by another member of Egypt's team. Egyptian judoka Ramadan Darwish had refused to shake hands with his Israeli opponent Ariel Zeevi, another Israeli Olympic bronze medalist, in both the 2011 Judo Grand Slam and the 2012 Judo Grand Prix.

The Egyptian Olympic Committee, which had put pressure on El Shehaby to have the match with Sasson go on as planned, stated that El Shehaby's actions after the match were a personal decision. Both the International Olympic Committee and the International Judo Federation stated that they would review the incident.

The Disciplinary Committee of the International Olympic Committee issued a "severe reprimand" to El Shehaby for behavior violating "the rules of fair play and against the spirit of friendship embodied in the Olympic Values," and he was sent home before the Olympics closing ceremony. The IOC Disciplinary Committee also requested that the Egyptian Olympic Committee in the future must ensure that all Egyptian athletes are properly educated as to the Olympic vales, before they participate in the Olympic Games.

Modern pentathlon

Egyptian athletes have qualified for the following spots to compete in modern pentathlon. Eslam Hamad and Haydy Morsy secured a selection each in the men's and women's event respectively by virtue of their top finish at the 2015 African Championships. Two-time Olympian Amro El-Geziry, who finished behind Hamad at the African Championships, and his younger brother Omar ranked among the top 10 modern pentathletes, not yet qualified, in the men's event based on the UIPM World Rankings as of 1 June 2016. With the Egyptian men to guarantee their selection at the 2016 World Championships, the choice of four modern pentathletes going to the Games was determined by the NOC. In the event, the Egyptian team decided to select them over Eslam Hamad, as the nation's top two on the list.

Rowing

Egypt has qualified one boat each in the men's and women's single sculls for the Games at the 2015 African Continental Qualification Regatta in Tunis, Tunisia.

Qualification Legend: FA=Final A (medal); FB=Final B (non-medal); FC=Final C (non-medal); FD=Final D (non-medal); FE=Final E (non-medal); FF=Final F (non-medal); SA/B=Semifinals A/B; SC/D=Semifinals C/D; SE/F=Semifinals E/F; QF=Quarterfinals; R=Repechage

Sailing

Egypt has qualified one sailor in the men's Laser class through the African continental regatta.

M = Medal race; EL = Eliminated – did not advance into the medal race

Shooting

Egyptian shooters have achieved quota places for the following events by virtue of their best finishes at the 2014 and 2015 ISSF World Championships, the 2015 ISSF World Cup series, and African Championships, as long as they obtained a minimum qualifying score (MQS) by 31 March 2016.

Men

Women

Qualification Legend: Q = Qualify for the next round; q = Qualify for the bronze medal (shotgun)

Swimming

Egyptian swimmers have so far achieved qualifying standards in the following events (up to a maximum of 2 swimmers in each event at the Olympic Qualifying Time (OQT), and potentially 1 at the Olympic Selection Time (OST)):

Men

Women

Synchronized swimming

Egypt has fielded a squad of nine synchronized swimmers to compete in the women's duet and team events, by virtue of their top national finish for Africa at the 2015 FINA World Championships.

Table tennis

Egypt has entered four athletes into the table tennis competition at the Games. Brothers Khalid and Omar Assar secured places on the Egyptian squad in the men's singles, while 2012 Olympians Nadeen El-Dawlatly and Dina Meshref in the women's singles; all of them have reached the semifinals in each of their respective events at the 2015 All-Africa Games.

Yousra Abdel Razek was awarded the third spot to build the women's team for the Games as the top African nation in the ITTF Olympic Rankings.

Taekwondo

Egypt entered three athletes into the taekwondo competition at the Olympics. 2012 Olympian Hedaya Malak qualified automatically for the women's lightweight category (57 kg) by finishing in the top 6 WTF Olympic rankings. Meanwhile, Ghofran Zaki and Seham El-Sawalhy secured the remaining spots on the Egyptian team by virtue of their top two finish respectively in the men's lightweight (68 kg) and women's welterweight category (67 kg) at the 2016 African Qualification Tournament in Agadir, Morocco.

Volleyball

Beach
Egypt women's beach volleyball team qualified for the Olympics by winning the CAVB Continental Cup final in Abuja, Nigeria, signifying the nation's Olympic debut in the sport.

Indoor

Men's tournament

Egypt men's volleyball team qualified for the Olympics by attaining a top finish and securing a lone outright berth at the African Olympic Qualifying Tournament in Brazzaville, Republic of the Congo.

Team roster

Group play

Weightlifting

Egyptian weightlifters have qualified six men's and three women's quota places for the Rio Olympics based on their combined team standing by points at the 2014 and 2015 IWF World Championships. The team must allocate these places to individual athletes by 20 June 2016.

Men

Women

Wrestling

Egypt has qualified a total of ten wrestlers for each of the following weight classes into the Olympic competition, as a result of their semifinal triumphs at the 2016 African & Oceania Qualification Tournament.

On 11 May 2016, United World Wrestling decided to revoke an Olympic license from Egypt in men's freestyle 97 kg, due to doping violations at the African Qualification Tournament.

Men's freestyle

Men's Greco-Roman

Women's freestyle

See also
Egypt at the 2016 Summer Paralympics

References

External links 

 
 

Nations at the 2016 Summer Olympics
2016
Olympics